Elton may refer to:

Places

England
 Elton, Cambridgeshire (formerly Huntingdonshire), a village
 Elton Hall, a baronial hall
 Elton, Cheshire, a village and civil parish
 Elton, County Durham, a village and civil parish
 Elton, Derbyshire, a village
 Elton, Greater Manchester, a suburb of Bury
 Elton, Herefordshire, a village and civil parish

United States
 Elton, Louisiana, a town
 Elton, Michigan, ghost town
 Elton, Nebraska, ghost town
 Elton, New Jersey, an unincorporated community
 Elton, Pennsylvania
 Elton, West Virginia, an unincorporated community
 Elton, Wisconsin, an unincorporated community

Elsewhere
 Rural Municipality of Elton, Manitoba, Canada
 Lake Elton, Russia

Other uses
 Elton (name), lists of people with the given name or surname
 Elton (comedian), a German television presenter and comedian
 Elton.tv, a German late-night talk show hosted by Elton
 Baron Elton, a title in the Peerage of the United Kingdom
 Elton baronets, a title in the Baronetage of Great Britain
 Elton Hotel, Waterbury, Connecticut, United States, on the National Register of Historic Places
 Elton awards, given annually by the British Council for innovation in English-language teaching

See also
 Alton (disambiguation)
 Elton on the Hill, Nottinghamshire, England